Denis Dorogaev is a Paralympic swimmer from Russia competing mainly in category SB9 events.

Denis competed in both the 2004 and 2008 Summer Paralympics. On both occasions he won a bronze medal in the 100m breaststroke for SB9 swimmers, he also swam as part of the Russian 4x100 medley team in the 2004 games where they finished sixth.

References

External links
 

Paralympic swimmers of Russia
Swimmers at the 2004 Summer Paralympics
Swimmers at the 2008 Summer Paralympics
Swimmers at the 2012 Summer Paralympics
Paralympic bronze medalists for Russia
Paralympic silver medalists for Russia
Russian male breaststroke swimmers
Living people
Medalists at the 2004 Summer Paralympics
Medalists at the 2008 Summer Paralympics
Medalists at the 2012 Summer Paralympics
Year of birth missing (living people)
Medalists at the World Para Swimming European Championships
Paralympic medalists in swimming
S9-classified Paralympic swimmers
20th-century Russian people
21st-century Russian people